Kyren Airport is a civilian airport 1 km southeast of Kyren in Russia.  The runway is asphalt.

Destinations

References 

Airports built in the Soviet Union
Airports in Buryatia